is a Japanese snowboarder. She competed in the 2018 Winter Olympics, and 2022 Winter Olympics.

Career
In 2022, she won a gold medal at Winter X Games XXVI, in half pipe.

Her sister is snowboarder Ruki Tomita.

References

1999 births
Living people
Snowboarders at the 2018 Winter Olympics
Snowboarders at the 2022 Winter Olympics
Japanese female snowboarders
Olympic snowboarders of Japan
Snowboarders at the 2017 Asian Winter Games
Medalists at the 2022 Winter Olympics
Olympic medalists in snowboarding
Olympic bronze medalists for Japan
21st-century Japanese women